Vicia peregrina, the wandering vetch, is a species of annual herb in the family Fabaceae. They are climbers and have compound, broad leaves. Individuals can grow to 0.32 m.

Sources

References 

peregrina
Flora of Malta